Liliana Alexandra Pascoal da Paixão (born 3 March 1988) is an Angolan handball player. She plays for the club Marinha de Guerra, in the Angolan handball league and on the Angolan national team. She represented Angola at the 2013 World Women's Handball Championship in Serbia.

References

Angolan female handball players
1988 births
Living people